Seongdong station is a closed station on the Gyeongchun Line in South Korea.

Defunct railway stations in South Korea